The 1998 NRL season was the 91st season of professional rugby league football in Australia, and the inaugural season of the newly formed National Rugby League (NRL). After the 1997 season, in which the Australian Rugby League and Super League organisations ran separate competitions parallel to each other, they joined to create a reunited competition in the NRL. The first professional rugby league club to be based in Victoria, the Melbourne Storm was introduced into the League, and with the closure of the Hunter Mariners, Western Reds and South Queensland Crushers, twenty teams competed for the premiership, which culminated in the 1998 NRL grand final between the Brisbane Broncos and Canterbury-Bankstown. It was also the final season for the Illawarra Steelers and the St. George Dragons as their own clubs prior to their merger into the St. George-Illawarra Dragons for the 1999 NRL season

Pre-season

The National Rugby League was formed after an agreement was reached between the two rivaling competitions from 1997, the Australian Rugby League and the Super League. In December 1997, the two parties formed a joint board to run the new Australian rugby league club competition. The vast majority of the 22 clubs that contested in 1997 across the split competitions also contested the first season of the National Rugby League, with the exception of the Hunter Mariners, the Western Reds and South Queensland.

The National Rugby League imposed a $3M salary cap on each of the clubs.

Advertising
Super League's ad agency VCD in Sydney successfully kept the account post-reunification. The 1998 ad featured the song "Tubthumping" by Chumbawamba with its theme of rising against adversity:
I get knocked down! But I get up again; you're never gonna keep me down.

There was no visual performance of the song in the ad which returned to the standard rugby league imagery of big hits and crunching tackles to accompany the track.

Teams
The closure of the Hunter Mariners, Western/Perth Reds and South Queensland Crushers, and the introduction of the Melbourne Storm meant that a total of twenty clubs contested the 1998 Premiership. Eleven of these clubs were from Sydney, but an agreement between the Australian Rugby League and Super League meant that many of these clubs were in danger of being cut from the competition by the 2000 season when, it was decided, only 14 clubs would be invited to contest the premiership.

Regular season
Rounds 5 and 7: Brisbane Broncos set a new record for their biggest win, firstly 58-4 against North Queensland Cowboys, then 60-6 against North Sydney Bears, both games being played at Queensland Sport and Athletics Centre.
Round 8: 1997 ARL premiers, the Newcastle Knights played the 1997 Super League premiers, the Brisbane Broncos and Brisbane won 26-6 in Newcastle before a crowd of 27,119, cementing their position at the top of the ladder.
Round 12: The record for the biggest comeback in premiership history was re-set by the North Queensland Cowboys who trailed 26–0 at half-time and came back to beat the Penrith Panthers 36–28.
Round 24: Ivan Cleary's tally of 284 points set a new individual record for most points scored in a season in Australian club rugby league history; it has since been beaten.

Ladder

Finals series
The biggest surprise of the season was when the Melbourne Storm finished 3rd after the regular season in their first ever year, only to be knocked out by the Brisbane Broncos in the Semi-final. The Canterbury-Bankstown Bulldogs became the lowest placed team ever to make the Grand Final, after finishing 9th after the regular season. Canterbury-Bankstown did it tough though, coming from 16 points down twice in as many weeks. They came from 16-0 down to win 28-16 against the Newcastle Knights in the Semi-final, then 18-2 down with 11 minutes to go to make it 18-18 after regulation time, then going on to win 32-20 in extra time against arch-rivals the Parramatta Eels in the preliminary final.

Grand Final

The 1998 NRL Grand Final was the conclusive and premiership-deciding game of the 1998 NRL season. It was the first grand final of the re-unified National Rugby League and featured minor premiers and the previous year's Super League premiers, the Brisbane Broncos against the Canterbury-Bankstown Bulldogs, who had finished the regular season 9th (out of 20) to make a top-ten play-off grouping. 

It was to be the first grand final under the National Rugby League partnership's administration and the last to be played at the Sydney Football Stadium. It was also the first time these two sides had met in a grand final. Brisbane scored first, but by half time trailed Canterbury 10–12. However, Brisbane scored 28 unanswered points in the second half, winning 12–38 and equaling the second highest score for a team in grand final history.

Player statistics
The following statistics are as of the conclusion of Round 24.

Top 5 point scorers

Top 5 try scorers

Top 5 goal scorers

Post season
Brisbane's consistent dominance over other teams at this period of time contributed to the National Rugby League's plans to cut the number of teams down to 14 in order to ensure competitiveness and the long-term financial success of the game.

Despite the inclusion of "national" in the new competition's name, both the Gold Coast and Adelaide clubs folded at the end of the 1998 season. A new Gold Coast side re-entered the competition nine years later in 2007.

1998 was the last season for the seventy-eight-year-old St. George Dragons and seventeen-year-old Illawarra Steelers clubs, which merged to form the NRL's first joint-venture team at the conclusion of the season, the St. George Illawarra Dragons, for inclusion in the 1999 Premiership.

1998 Transfers

Players

Coaches

References

External links
 Rugby League Tables - Notes The World of Rugby League
 Rugby League Tables - Season 1998 The World of Rugby League
 Premiership History and Statistics RL1908
 1998 - Broncos Take Inaugural NRL Competition RL1908